Grossmont College is a public community college in El Cajon, California. Its name originated with the silent film actor and producer William J. Gross, who was enticed by Ed Fletcher to invest the purchase of land, part of which was called Grossmont. The campus sits in the Fletcher Hills community of El Cajon and is bordered by the cities of San Diego and Santee. Grossmont College along with Cuyamaca College make up what is the Grossmont-Cuyamaca Community College District. Grossmont is part of the California Community College System.

Grossmont College is also home to Grossmont Middle College High School, where selected high school students can receive both high school and college credit for taking courses on campus. The newspaper for Grossmont College is The Summit. Its radio station is Griffin Radio.

Facilities

The facilities of Grossmont College are situated across 135 acres. At its inception, the campus was planned to accommodate an enrollment of 2,500 daytime students. The first incarnation of the completed campus was expected to hold 4,800 students. On October 18, 1965, a bond for $3.5 million was approved by area voters. This made it possible to complete the college's initial master plan. By September 25, 1967, the new facilities were completed. Since that time, student enrollment increased dramatically and created the need for new and remodeled campus facilities.

In recent years, the college has undergone major improvements of its facilities including:

Academics
Grossmont College offers more than 150 degree and certificate programs. Each year, about 1,500 students earn Associate in Arts degrees, Associate in Science degrees, and/or advanced/basic certificates. In addition, the students are offered general education and transfer programs.

Athletics

Grossmont College offers several men's and women's intercollegiate sports:

Notable alumni
 Sergio Bailey II - NFL and XFL football player
Lester Bangs - Music journalist
 Doug Benson - Comedian
 Brad Daluiso - American football player
 Quintin Berry - MLB Player, Boston Red Sox
 Rachel Bilson - American actress
 Chad DeGrenier - American football player and coach
 Stephanie Nicole Garcia-Colace - Professional wrestler, actress, known as Nikki Bella
Mark Goffeney (1969-2021) - Armless guitar player, child celebrity, disability advocate
 Arthur Hobbs - Defensive back for the Hamilton Tiger-Cats
 Barry Jantz - Former La Mesa City Councilman/CEO of Grossmont Healthcare District
Brian Jones (born 1968) - politician serving in the California State Senate
 David Leisure - Actor
 Kevin McCadam - NFL defensive back, Atlanta Falcons
 Dan Melville - American football player
 Dat Phan - Vietnamese American stand-up comedian
 Joe Roth - College football quarterback
 Sean O'Sullivan - MLB Player, Boston Red Sox
 Cathy Scott - True crime author and journalist
 Bernard Seigal - Musician, Beat Farmers' original member, music journalist, editor college newspaper The Summit
 Scott Sherman - former San Diego City Council member
 Brian Sipe - NFL quarterback, Cleveland Browns
 Akili Smith - NFL quarterback, Cincinnati Bengals
 Casey Tiumalu - NFL running back, Los Angeles Rams
 Todd Watkins - NFL wide receiver

References

External links

Griffin Radio

California Community Colleges
Education in El Cajon, California
Universities and colleges in San Diego County, California
Schools accredited by the Western Association of Schools and Colleges
1961 establishments in California
Educational institutions established in 1961
Two-year colleges in the United States